Rail Link is a subsidiary company of Genesee & Wyoming Inc.

Rail Link may also refer to:
Rail Link (horse)
Rail Link Engineering
Railink (now KAI Bandara), Subsidiary of Kereta Api Indonesia

See also